The GE AC4400CW, sometimes referred as "AC44CW" is a  diesel-electric locomotive that was built by GE Transportation Systems between 1993 and 2004. It is like the Dash 9-44CW, but features AC traction motors instead of DC, with a separate inverter per motor. In appearance, the AC4400CW is somewhat similar to GE's more powerful locomotive, the AC6000CW.  

Over the 11 years in which it was produced, GE constructed 2,834 examples for North American railroads. In 2005, all Class I freight railroads except Norfolk Southern and Canadian National owned at least one AC4400CW. Norfolk Southern ordered the very similar C40-9Ws. As a result of more stringent emissions requirements that came into effect on January of that year, GE no longer offers the AC4400CW, replacing it with the ES44AC.

Design variations
The AC4400CW was the first GE locomotive to offer an optional self-steering truck design, intended to increase adhesion and reduce wear on the railhead. This option was specified by Canadian Pacific, Cartier Railway, CSX for their units 200-599, Ferromex, Ferrosur, and KCS.

CSX ordered many of its AC4400CW locomotives with  extra weight to increase tractive effort. These same units were also modified in 2006-2007 with a "high tractive effort" software upgrade and redesignated CW44AH.

Rebuilds 
In 2017 Canadian Pacific Railway requested that General Electric modernize 30 of its 9500 and 9600-series AC4400CW units. The original units had the original front cab completely removed and upgraded to current GE standards with upgraded electrical systems including PTC and FTO systems. Other improvements GE has made include up to 10 percent fuel efficiency gains, 40 percent increase in reliability and 50 percent increase in haulage ability. The units were subsequently placed into service with the designation AC4400CWM (for Modernized). The first batch of rebuilds (8100-8129) also had their original Steerable trucks replaced with GEs High Adhesion trucks, where later batches each individual engine kept the trucks they already had. 

The following year Canadian Pacific asked GE to similarly rebuild several more batches for a total of 110 locomotives. The second order (8130-8144) retains their steerable trucks. The third batch (8000-8064) will feature an Evolution Series sized fuel tank and radial trucks. In 2019 a fourth batch of rebuilds happened, 8145-8160 & 8064-8080 from the 95/9600-series. In 2021 both the 8500 series is slated to be rebuilt at 8201-8280 and the 8100-series be completed. 

Union Pacific ordered many of their AC4400CWs with Controlled Tractive Effort software, giving them the designation of AC4400CW-CTE. This software package is now standard on a portion of their ES44ACs as well. CTE limits tractive effort to mimic TE level of Dash series locomotives.

In 2018 Union Pacific placed a small order for 20 rebuilds from GE of their AC4460AC fleet and later announced over the next fifteen years they will be upgrading 1000 of their AC4460ACs and AC44s into what they call a C44ACM. Unlike CP, the original 20 rebuilds did not receive a new crew cab.

CSX and Wabtec have announced a partnership in rebuilding CSX's large AC4400CW fleet. An initial batch of 10 CW44ACs were rebuilt at Wabtec's Erie, Pennsylvania facility, with 40 more to follow into 2020. The rebuilds will be numbered in the 7000, 7200, and 7500 series and CSX is referring to them as CM44ACs.

Operators
AC4400CW owners and operators past and present include:

In popular culture 
The plot of the movie Unstoppable required Denzel Washington and Chris Pine to climb aboard the lead locomotive of a runaway freight train. To film the movie, four Canadian Pacific AC4400CW locomotives (numbers 9777, 9758, 9782, and 9751), were repainted as two fictional "Allegheny and West Virginia Railroad" locomotives (nos. 777 (nicknamed "Triple 7") and 767). 9777 and 9782 were painted as 777, while 9758 and 9751 were painted as 767.

References 

Diesel-electric locomotives of the United States
General Electric locomotives
C-C locomotives
Railway locomotives introduced in 1993
Freight locomotives
Standard gauge locomotives of Canada
Standard gauge locomotives of the United States
Standard gauge locomotives of Mexico
Diesel-electric locomotives of Canada
Diesel-electric locomotives of Mexico